is a Prefectural Natural Park in Awa, Tokushima Prefecture, Japan. It was established in 1967.

See also
 National Parks of Japan

References

Parks and gardens in Tokushima Prefecture
Protected areas established in 1967
1967 establishments in Japan
Awa, Tokushima